The Roewe Marvel X is an electric compact crossover SUVs manufactured by the Chinese manufacturer SAIC Group under the Roewe brand. The Roewe Marvel X was launched in 2018 and was positioned above the Roewe RX5, and below the Roewe RX8. A revised version is marketed under separate brand Rising Auto as the Rising Marvel R, which is sold in left-hand drive European market as the MG Marvel R.

The Marvel R is positioned as part of the R-Line, which is a premium NEV sub-brand of Roewe by SAIC and is represented by the "R" logo.

Roewe Marvel X
The Roewe Marvel X is the production version of the Vision E Concept, that debuted in April 2017, during the 2017 Shanghai Auto Show. The Roewe Marvel X crossover comes in two versions, in rear wheel drive and all wheel drive.

Power of the Marvel X comes from a 52.5kWh lithium ion battery. The battery takes 8.5 hours to charge on an AC charger, but a DC fast charger can charge the battery up to 85% in under 40 minutes. A kinetic energy recovery system is installed to improve range.

Rising Marvel R
The Rising Marvel R was unveiled as a concept car in May 2020, and the production version debuted during the 2020 Guangzhou Auto Show in November 2020. The Marvel R is the first car to feature Roewe’s new R logo and the first product in the R-Line, followed by the Roewe R ER6 which is based on the Roewe i6 and would be available on the market first.

The Marvel R retains the overall shape of the Marvel X but gets a reworked front and rear for cleaner electric vehicle looks and aerodynamics. Roewe has co-developed the Marvel R with Huawei and the electronic system is built on the Barong 5000 technology platform equipped with V2X smart travel tech and creates a 5G smart cockpit. SAIC Motor Corporation, the parent company of Rising Auto, has been cooperating with Huawei since December 2018.

In March 2021, it was announced that the vehicle will be sold as the MG Marvel R in the European market.

Safety

Euro NCAP
The MG Marvel R in its standard European configuration received 4 stars from Euro NCAP in 2021.

References

External links

 (Roewe Marvel X)
 (Marvel R)

Compact sport utility vehicles
Crossover sport utility vehicles
Euro NCAP small off-road
Production electric cars
Marvel X
Cars introduced in 2018
Cars of China
Vehicles codeveloped with Huawei